Cesare Benedetti (born 1987) is an Italian cyclist.

Cesare Benedetti may refer to:

 Cesare Benedetti (footballer, born October 1920), Italian footballer with Roma and Salernitana and later, painter
 Cesare Benedetti (footballer, born November 1920), Italian footballer who most notably played in France for Marseille and Toulouse, see :it:Cesare Benedetti (calciatore 1920-1990)